Chiswell's Inheritance, also known as Chiswell's Manor, Chiswell's Delight and Grayhaven Manor, is a historic home located at Poolesville, Montgomery County, Maryland, United States. It is a two-story, five-bay brick plantation house with an attached kitchen wing on the south end. Inlaid in glazed brick near the peak of the gable is the inscription "C S" with the date "1796" below.

Chiswell's Inheritance was listed on the National Register of Historic Places in 1974.

References

External links
, including photo in 1973, at Maryland Historical Trust website

Houses on the National Register of Historic Places in Maryland
Houses completed in 1796
Houses in Montgomery County, Maryland
Plantation houses in Maryland
Historic American Buildings Survey in Maryland
National Register of Historic Places in Montgomery County, Maryland
1796 establishments in Maryland